Aenghus Ua Flainn (died 1036) was Abbot of Clonfert. An apparent kinsman, Coinneccám Ua Flainn, was also abbot and died in 1081.

References 

 Annals of Ulster at CELT: Corpus of Electronic Texts at University College Cork
 Annals of Tigernach at CELT: Corpus of Electronic Texts at University College Cork
Revised edition of McCarthy's synchronisms at Trinity College Dublin.
 Byrne, Francis John (2001), Irish Kings and High-Kings, Dublin: Four Courts Press, 

Christian clergy from County Galway
11th-century Irish abbots
1036 deaths
Year of birth unknown